William Ruto became President of Kenya on 13 September 2022 following the 2022 Kenyan general election. While, William Ruto travelled extensively for official business as Deputy President of Kenya, the following is a list of international presidential trips made by William Ruto since assuming office.

Summary of international trips

2022 
The following international trips were made by William Ruto in 2022.

2023 
The following international trips were made by William Ruto in 2023.

References 

2022 in international relations
Ruto, William
Ruto, William
Foreign relations of Kenya
International presidential trips
Ruto, William